Ironbridge is a large village in the borough of Telford and Wrekin in Shropshire, England. Located on the bank of the River Severn, at the heart of the Ironbridge Gorge, it lies in the civil parish of The Gorge. Ironbridge developed beside, and takes its name from, The Iron Bridge, a  cast iron bridge that was built in 1779.

History
The area around Ironbridge is described by those promoting it as a tourist destination as the "Birthplace of the Industrial Revolution". This description is based on the idea that Abraham Darby perfected the technique of smelting iron with coke, in Coalbrookdale, allowing much cheaper production of iron. However, the industrial revolution did not begin in any one place. Darby's iron smelting was but one small part of this generalised revolution and was soon superseded by the great iron-smelting areas.  However, the bridge – being the first of its kind fabricated from cast iron, and one of the few which have survived to the present day – remains an important symbol representative of the dawn of the industrial age.

The grandson of the first Abraham Darby, Abraham Darby III, built the bridge – originally designed by Thomas Farnolls Pritchard – to link the two areas. Construction began in 1779, and the bridge opened on New Year's Day 1781. Soon afterwards the ancient Madeley market was relocated to the new purpose-built square and Georgian Butter Cross. The former dispersed settlement of Madeley Wood gained a planned urban focus as Ironbridge, the commercial and administrative centre of the Coalbrookdale coalfield.

The Iron Bridge proprietors also built the Tontine Hotel to accommodate visitors to the new bridge and the industrial sites of the Severn Gorge. Across a square facing the hotel, stands Ironbridge's war memorial, which was erected in 1924. It is a bronze statue of a First World War soldier in marching order, sculpted by Arthur George Walker, whose signature appears as does that of A.B. Burton, the foundry worker who erected it.
On the hillside above the river are situated the stone-built 16th-century hunting lodge at Lincoln Hill, many 17th- and 18th-century workers' cottages, some imposing Georgian houses built by ironmasters and mine and river barge owners, and many early Victorian villas built from the various coloured bricks and tiles of the locality.

St Luke's Church (1837) in simple Commissioners' Gothic by Samuel Smith of Madeley, has stained glass by David Evans of Shrewsbury. Its design is unusual in that the sanctuary is at the west-end and the tower at the east, in reverse to the majority of churches. This is because the land at the west-end was unstable and unable to take the weight of a tower. The bells in the church tower were installed in 1920 as a memorial to parishioners who died in World War I, and the external church clock was illuminated in memory of those who died in World War II. The living was endowed as a rectory when the parish was created from Madeley in 1847, and is now a united benefice with Coalbrookdale and Little Wenlock, in the Diocese of Hereford.

The former Ironbridge and Broseley railway station, on the Severn Valley line (GWR) from Hartlebury to Shrewsbury, was situated on the south side of the Iron Bridge until 1966. Ironbridge was the birthplace of England National Football Team captain Billy Wright.

Present day

By the 19th century, Ironbridge had had many well-known visitors, including Benjamin Disraeli, but by the mid-20th century, the settlements and industries of the gorge were in decline. In 1986, though, Ironbridge became part of a UNESCO World Heritage Site (which covers the wider Ironbridge Gorge area) and has since become a major tourist attraction within Shropshire. Most industries in Ironbridge are now tourist-related; however, the Merrythought teddy bear company (established in 1930) is still manufacturing in Ironbridge and has a small museum there too. Amongst other things, the centre of Ironbridge is host to a post office, pharmacy, various pubs, cafés and many small independent shops.

Ironbridge was struck by an F1/T2 tornado on 23 November 1981, as part of the record-breaking nationwide tornado outbreak on that day. On Thursday 10 July 2003 The Queen and the Duke of Edinburgh made a visit to Shropshire which included a visit to Ironbridge, and a walk over the bridge itself.

An annual Coracle Regatta is held in August on the River Severn at Ironbridge, along with many other events throughout the year. This is mainly because the coracle-making family of Rogers lived in Ironbridge for several generations. Just outside Ironbridge in Coalbrookdale is the Ironbridge Institute, a partnership between the University of Birmingham and the Ironbridge Gorge Museum Trust offering postgraduate and professional development in heritage.

Flooding

Ironbridge has an annually recurring problem of flooding from the River Severn, as do many other parts of Shropshire. Flooding has previously caused much damage and disruption to the Wharfage, which accommodates both The Swan and White Hart pubs, and various private homes. Starting in February 2004, DEFRA in association with the Environment Agency implemented a portable barrier which is erected at times of floods. At its peak, the flood water has reached a depth of  against the barrier.

On 26 February 2020, after large amounts of rainfall brought by storms Ciara and Dennis, the portable barrier was compromised, requiring an evacuation of all residents from the wharfage. Ironbridge flooded again in February 2022.

Notable people
The Rogers Family (1778 - 2003) known for building and using coracles on the River Severn for generations
Thomas Parker (1843-1915), electrical engineer and inventor, had his last home at Severn House, Ironbridge, from 1908.
George Sedgwick (1846–1934) a British trade union leader, born in Ironbridge.
Billy Wright CBE (1924–1994) a footballer who played for Wolverhampton Wanderers F.C. throughput his career and the first player to earn 100 international caps for England.
Roger Squires (born 1932) a British crossword compiler who lives in Ironbridge and holds the Guinness Book of Records title as the most prolific crossword compiler.
Ian Blakemore (born 1965) an English cricketer, left-handed batsman and left-arm slow bowler who played for Herefordshire
Jay Blades MBE (born 1970) furniture restorer and television presenter, lives here.
Cancer a death/thrash metal band formed in Ironbridge in 1988, which released five full-length albums

The Ironbridge Gorge Museums 
The Ironbridge Gorge Museum Trust owns and operates 10 museums throughout the Ironbridge Gorge World Heritage Site; they collectively tell the story of the Industrial Revolution.

The museums include:

 Blists Hill Victorian Town
 Coalport China Museum
 Tar Tunnel
 Jackfield Tile Museum
 Broseley Pipeworks
 The Iron Bridge Tollhouse
 Museum of The Gorge
 Coalbrookdale Museum of Iron
 The Darby Houses
 Enginuity

See also
Ironbridge Gorge Museums
The Iron Bridge
Ironbridge Power Station
Coalbrookdale by Night
Listed buildings in The Gorge

References

External links

Guide to Ironbridge for visitors
Official Tourism Guide to Ironbridge
Ironbridge Visitor Guide
Ironbridge Archaeology
Ironbridge Pub Locations
Landslides in the Ironbridge Gorge by the British Geological Survey

Populated places on the River Severn
Telford and Wrekin
History of Shropshire
Ironbridge Gorge